Jeffrén Isaac Suárez Bermúdez (born 20 January 1988), known simply as Jeffrén, is a Venezuelan footballer who plays as a forward or winger for Thai League 1 club Lamphun Warriors.

He started his career with Barcelona, appearing rarely and signing with Sporting CP in 2011. Other than in Spain, he also played professionally in Portugal, Belgium, Switzerland, Cyprus, Croatia, the United Arab Emirates and Thailand.

Jeffrén won 30 caps for Spain at youth level, winning the European Championships with the under-19 and the under-21 teams. In 2015, he made his senior debut for Venezuela.

Early life
Born in Ciudad Bolívar, Venezuela, Jeffrén was just one year old when his family left the country for the Spanish island of Tenerife.

FC Barcelona talent scouts spotted him and, in 2004, he was signed for its youth teams from CD Tenerife, first being coached by Guillermo Hoyos, who played him as a midfielder.

Club career

Barcelona
Jeffrén played three full seasons with FC Barcelona B, suffering Segunda División B relegation in 2006–07 and scoring six goals in 30 games the following season in an immediate promotion. On 8 November 2006, at the age of 18, he made his debut with the first team, against CF Badalona in a Copa del Rey round-of-32 match, coming on as a substitute for Javier Saviola in the 83rd minute of a 4–0 home win (6–1 on aggregate).

Impressed at the player's performance for the reserves, first-team manager Pep Guardiola called Jeffrén for the 2008–09 pre-season, where he played all seven matches scoring twice, including once on 30 July against ACF Fiorentina in the 47th minute of a 3–1 victory. On 17 May 2009, he made his first La Liga appearance (of two in the season), as already crowned champions Barcelona lost 1–2 at RCD Mallorca.

On 19 December 2009, Jeffrén replaced Thierry Henry late into the FIFA Club World Cup final against Estudiantes de La Plata. Two days later, he picked up a leg muscle injury that left him out for 4–5 weeks in a 1–1 friendly draw with Kazma SC in Kuwait, in commemoration of the Asian side's 45th anniversary.

On 10 February 2010, Barcelona announced Jeffrén had signed a contract extension with the club, keeping him at the Camp Nou until 30 June 2012 with a buyout clause set at €10 million. On the 14th, he started as right back in a 2–1 loss at Atlético Madrid.

On 3 April 2010, Jeffrén scored his first top-division goal after a low cross from Eric Abidal, in a 4–1 home defeat of Athletic Bilbao. On the 24th he added another in spectacular fashion, in a 3–1 home win over Xerez CD and, as the Catalans renewed their domestic supremacy, finished the campaign with 18 official appearances.

Jeffrén appeared less for Barças first team in 2010–11. On 29 November 2010, he came from the bench to close the scoring in El Clásico against Real Madrid, in a 5–0 home victory.

Sporting CP
On 4 August 2011, Sporting CP signed Jeffrén for €3.75 million, plus €200,000 in bonus. He penned a five-year contract with a buy-out clause of €30 million. In addition, if the Lisbon club sold the player for a fee higher than €3.75M, Barcelona would receive 20% of the added value/differential value;Comunicado (announcement); Portuguese Securities Market Commission, 3 August 2011 (in Portuguese) the Catalans also retained an exclusive buy-back option for €8 million and €12 million, in 2012 and 2013 respectively.
 
Jeffrén played his first competitive match with Sporting on 13 August 2011, in a 1–1 home draw against S.C. Olhanense. He spent the vast majority of the first half of his first season sidelined with physical problems.

Jeffrén returned to action on 11 March 2012, and only needed 12 minutes on the pitch to score two goals in a 5–0 home victory over Vitória de Guimarães. He contributed only 13 league games in his second year, and was deemed surplus to requirements subsequently.

Valladolid
On 1 February 2014, Jeffrén returned to the Spanish top flight when he joined Real Valladolid on a two-and-a-half-year deal. He made his debut on 9 February at home against Elche CF, coming on at half time for Víctor Pérez: he crossed the ball for Humberto Osorio's 2–2 equaliser, but only a minute later left the pitch with a muscular injury after his team had already used all three substitutes.

Jeffrén scored his first goal for Valladolid on 2 November 2014, coming off the bench to score an 81st-minute winner in a 2–1 win against Girona FC at the Estadio Nuevo José Zorrilla that put his team on top of the second division table. He finished the campaign with three goals from 35 appearances, the other two coming in each fixture against former side Barcelona B – the first being a 7–0 thrashing on 21 December.

On 29 August 2015, Jeffrén terminated his contract with the Castile and León club.

Eupen
On the same day as leaving Valladolid, Jeffrén signed a three-year deal at K.A.S. Eupen from the Belgian Second Division. He made his debut on 13 September, replacing Guy Dufour in the 57th minute of a 1–4 home loss to K. Lierse SK. He scored his first goal for his new team thirteen days later, an added-time strike to seal a 3–1 win over R. White Star Bruxelles at the Kehrwegstadion.

On 3 October 2015, Jeffrén netted twice in a 5–1 rout at K.S.K. Heist. He finished the season with three successful strikes in 17 matches, as the side came third and were promoted to the Belgian First Division A for administrative reasons.

Later years
Jeffren signed for Grasshopper Club Zürich of the Swiss Super League on a two-year deal on 9 July 2017. He left in late January 2019 for AEK Larnaca FC in the Cypriot First Division and, one year later, switched to the Croatian First Football League with NK Slaven Belupo.

After a brief spell with Al Dhaid SC in the United Arab Emirates, Jeffrén signed with Lamphun Warriors F.C. of the Thai League 2 in June 2021.

International career
Spain youth

Jeffrén was part of the Spain under-19 squad that won the 2006 UEFA European Championship, playing eight matches and scoring three goals. Shortly after, he was called by Venezuela national team coach Richard Páez for the 2007 Copa América, but decided not to switch allegiance.

On 6 February 2009, Jeffrén received his first under-21 callup. In 2011 he was selected by manager Luis Milla for the European Championships in Denmark, appearing in three games and scoring in the semi-final against Belarus (3–1 win) as the national team won their third trophy in the category.

Venezuela
Following his Spanish international youth spell, Jeffrén showed openness to represent Venezuela at senior level, an option he himself had discarded in 2010 when he was consulted by a journalist of his native country. On 19 March 2015, however, he acquired the necessary paperwork, being called up for the first time on 18 August and winning his first cap on 8 September by playing 31 minutes in a 1–1 friendly with Panama.

Career statistics

Honours
ClubBarcelona BTercera División: 2007–08BarcelonaLa Liga: 2008–09, 2009–10, 2010–11
Supercopa de España: 2009, 2010
UEFA Champions League: 2010–11
FIFA Club World Cup: 2009
Copa del Rey runner-up: 2010–11Sporting CPTaça de Portugal runner-up: 2011–12Lamphun WarriorThai League 2: 2021–22

InternationalSpain U21UEFA European Under-21 Championship: 2011Spain U19'
UEFA European Under-19 Championship: 2006

References

External links

1988 births
Living people
People from Ciudad Bolívar
Venezuelan emigrants to Spain
Venezuelan footballers
Spanish footballers
Association football wingers
Association football forwards
La Liga players
Segunda División players
Segunda División B players
Tercera División players
FC Barcelona C players
FC Barcelona Atlètic players
FC Barcelona players
Real Valladolid players
Primeira Liga players
Sporting CP footballers
Belgian Pro League players
Challenger Pro League players
K.A.S. Eupen players
Swiss Super League players
Grasshopper Club Zürich players
Cypriot First Division players
AEK Larnaca FC players
Croatian Football League players
NK Slaven Belupo players
UEFA Champions League winning players
UAE First Division League players
Al Dhaid SC players
Jeffren Suarez
Jeffren Suarez
Jeffren Suarez
Spain youth international footballers
Spain under-21 international footballers
Venezuela international footballers
Spanish expatriate footballers
Venezuelan expatriate footballers
Expatriate footballers in Portugal
Expatriate footballers in Belgium
Expatriate footballers in Switzerland
Expatriate footballers in Cyprus
Expatriate footballers in Croatia
Expatriate footballers in the United Arab Emirates
Expatriate footballers in Thailand
Venezuelan expatriate sportspeople in Spain
Venezuelan expatriate sportspeople in Portugal
Venezuelan expatriate sportspeople in Belgium
Venezuelan expatriate sportspeople in Switzerland
Venezuelan expatriate sportspeople in Cyprus
Venezuelan expatriate sportspeople in Croatia
Venezuelan expatriate sportspeople in the United Arab Emirates
Venezuelan expatriate sportspeople in Thailand